Nonyma allardi is a species of beetle in the family Cerambycidae. It was described by Breuning in 1972.

References

allardi
Beetles described in 1972